Siniša Gagula (born January 3, 1984) is a Bosnian-Herzegovinian retired footballer who last played for FK Laktaši. He also holds Croatian citizenship.

Club career
Gagula has played for OFI Crete and FK Borac Banja Luka. In his early years he played in the Ajax youth system, in a team alongside future Holland international player Hedwiges Maduro.

References

1984 births
Living people
Sportspeople from Banja Luka
Association football defenders
Bosnia and Herzegovina footballers
FK Borac Banja Luka players
NK Široki Brijeg players
OFI Crete F.C. players
FK Laktaši players
Super League Greece players
Premier League of Bosnia and Herzegovina players
First League of the Republika Srpska players
Bosnia and Herzegovina expatriate footballers
Expatriate footballers in the Netherlands
Bosnia and Herzegovina expatriate sportspeople in the Netherlands
Expatriate footballers in the Czech Republic
Bosnia and Herzegovina expatriate sportspeople in the Czech Republic
Expatriate footballers in Greece
Bosnia and Herzegovina expatriate sportspeople in Greece